Blüthner may refer to:

10857 Blüthner, a main belt asteroid
Blüthner, a German piano brand
Blüthner Orchestra, a German orchestra supported by the piano maker
Julius Blüthner, a German piano maker